Aplington–Parkersburg Community School District is a rural public school district in Parkersburg, Iowa. Occupying portions of Butler and Grundy counties, it serves the towns of Aplington and Parkersburg.

History
The district formed on July 1, 2004, with the merger of the Aplington Community School District and the Parkersburg Community School District. The predecessor districts had started sharing grades and activities in 1992. Enrollment declines contributed to the grade-sharing and the merger; the two districts together had 947 students in 1992 and 886 students in 2001; in 2003 the enrollment projection for 2006 was 762 students. The State of Iowa had already paid money to the pre-merger districts in exchange for having their grade-sharing, and it promised $500,000 for a successful merger.

Rob Hughes was scheduled to begin his role as superintendent of both A-P CSD and of Grundy Center Community School District effective July 1, 2019.  He resigned in March 2021, becoming a full-time superintendent at Grundy Center.

Travis Fleshner was hired as superintendent in June 2022.

Schools
 Aplington Elementary School - Aplington
 Parkersburg Elementary School - Parkersburg
 Aplington–Parkersburg Middle School - Aplington
 Aplington–Parkersburg High School - Parkersburg

See also
List of school districts in Iowa

References

External links
 Aplington-Parkersburg Community School District

School districts in Iowa
Education in Butler County, Iowa
Education in Grundy County, Iowa
2004 establishments in Iowa
School districts established in 2004